Korihor is an anti-christ described in  in the Book of Mormon.

Life

Korihor is directly referred to in the Book of Mormon as Anti-Christ, because he claimed there will be no Christ. Korihor was able to preach his views to the people because of the land's freedom of religion. These teachings alarmed the clerical government in Zarahemla, who felt that his views were dangerous to their society, as people had begun to ignore the laws of the land (which were based on the religious beliefs of their society). He attempted to preach to the people of Ammon, but the residents had kicked him out of Jershon. He also tried preaching in Gideon and he was arrested; before a high priest, during a hearing for his apparent blasphemy and for causing social discord, Korihor offered a speech in his own defense. Korihor was turned over to higher authority and later got into an argument with the chief judge and governor, Alma regarding the existence of God. Alma responded to Korihor's arguments, stating that all things testified that there is a God. Korihor finally demanded that Alma show him a sign from God or he, Korihor, would not believe in God. This culminated in Korihor being miraculously rendered deaf and mute, upon which Korihor confessed, in writing:

Korihor begged for forgiveness, but Alma, sensing that Korihor would go back to his wicked ways, cast Korihor out. Korihor became a beggar and was later trampled to death by the Zoramites, a group who had separated themselves from the main Nephite society.

Teachings 

Korihor's statements provide explicit arguments for atheism, which have been categorized as arguments for agnosticism, empiricism, secular humanism, and relativism. Perhaps because of the direct treatment that Korihor gives the topic of atheism, his words have been cited by skeptics as exemplary, while devotees cite his teachings in an attempt to inoculate their audiences against similar heresy. 

Korihor's argument was two-fold. First, that "ye cannot know of things which ye do not see", from which he extrapolated that there is no fairness or unfairness, no crime or sin, no cause for shame, and no eternal consequence of actions. In the absence of sin, the need for an atoning sacrifice and the ordinances and religious participation to connect people to that atoning sacrifice are obviated, and followers are instead encouraged to "look up with boldness", "enjoy their rights and privileges", and "make use of that which is their own". Second, Korihor hypothesizes that the only reason for perpetuation of orthodox beliefs is "a foolish and vain hope" on the part of believers, and, on the part of priests and teachers, a desire "to usurp power and authority over [the people]" and "keep them down, even as it were in bondage, that ye may glut yourselves with the labors of their hands".

Possible origin of the name 

Hugh Nibley relates the name to Egypt, and states:

"The first high priest [of the twenty-first dynasty in Egypt] was called Korihor, and his son was called Piankhi - two Book of Mormon names."

Nibley relates Korihor's name to Kherihor, a high priest at Thebes.

Notes

Further reading

External links
 Korihor on FAIR (A Mormon apologetic site)

Book of Mormon people
Skepticism
Antichrist